Sadr Expressway is a freeway in northern Tehran, Iran.

This freeway runs west from the Modarres Expressway in Gholhak neighborhood east through Gheytarieh, Doulat, Darrous, Chizar, and Ekhtiariyeh, at which point it crosses Pasdaran Avenue and becomes Babayi Expressway.

Expressways in Tehran